88th parallel may refer to:

88th parallel north, a circle of latitude in the Northern Hemisphere, in the Arctic Ocean
88th parallel south, a circle of latitude in the Southern Hemisphere, in Antarctica